Charles R. Pellegrino (born 1953) is an American writer, the author of several books related to science and archaeology, including Return to Sodom and Gomorrah, Ghosts of the Titanic, Unearthing Atlantis, and Ghosts of Vesuvius.  Pellegrino falsely claimed to have earned a PhD, and errors in his book The Last Train from Hiroshima (2010) prompted its publisher to withdraw it within a few months of publication.

Early life
During the mid-1970s, Pellegrino earned bachelor's and master's degrees at Long Island University.

Controversies

Ghosts of the Titantic

In a scathing review of Ghosts of the Titantic (2000) in The New York Times, Michael Parfit wrote:

"If Charles Pellegrino weren't so shamelessly self-promoting, it might be O.K. to let this book drift into oblivion past the icebergs that it ought to hit. But he quotes himself in epigraphs, invents friendships with famous people and claims scientific authority for a work that flouts most principles of scientific scholarship. He shouldn't get away with it."

Parfit's final paragraph begins: "Pellegrino has an agile mind, which has carried him through books on Atlantis, Sodom and Gomorrah and the lunar module. What's sad about all this is that if he hadn't claimed authority that isn't his, had checked his facts more carefully and had more honestly labeled his reconstructions and speculations as imaginative, the book might have had promise."

Last Train from Hiroshima

In January 2010, Henry Holt published Pellegrino's Last Train from Hiroshima, a look at the nuclear bombing of Hiroshima from the vantage of survivors.

The New York Times initially praised the book as "sober and authoritative" and as a "firm and compelling synthesis of earlier memoirs and archival material". Nevertheless, a month later the New York Times questioned claims made in Pellegrino's book:

Veterans of the 509th Operations Group, the Air Force unit which dropped the atomic bombs, issued a detailed list of substantive problems with many of the book's claims about the bomb and the Air Force personnel involved.

The New York Times added, "Facing a national outcry and the Corliss family’s evidence, the author, Charles Pellegrino, now concedes that he was probably duped. . . . [H]e said he would rewrite sections of the book for paperback and foreign editions."  Despite Pellegrino's claim in The New York Times that he had been "duped" by Fuoco, further investigation revealed that Pellegrino had repeatedly mentioned one of the book's most disputed claims (a supposedly fatal accident at Tinian Island on 4 August 1945) before Mr. Fuoco had allegedly confided it for him. Doubts also arose about the existence of two westerners allegedly present in Hiroshima at the time of the bombing.

On 1 March 2010, Henry Holt announced it had halted publication of Last Train from Hiroshima.

Pellegrino subsequently revised the text to remove some of the disputed content. The book was retitled "To Hell and Back" and released by a different publisher in 2015.

Doctoral degree

Pellegrino claimed to have received a PhD in 1982 from Victoria University of Wellington in New Zealand. Victoria University denied that claim. Pellegrino responded that the university had "stripped him of his Ph.D. because of a disagreement over evolutionary theory". The New Zealand Herald reported that Pellegrino claimed his credentials had been restored by 1997. The university investigated the matter, and in 2010, The New York Times reported:

Works
The Jesus Family Tomb: The Discovery, the Investigation, and the Evidence That Could Change History (2007) (co-authored with Simcha Jacobovici) was a companion book to the Discovery Channel documentary on the same subject created in part by film director James Cameron.

Bibliography

Non-fiction
 Time Gate: Hurtling Backward Through History (1983)
 Darwin's Universe: Origins and Crises in the History of Life (with Jesse A. Stoff, 1983)
 Chariots for Apollo: The Untold Story Behind the Race to the Moon (with Joshua Stoff, 1985)
 Interstellar Travel and Communication (with James Powell and Isaac Asimov, et al., 1986)
 Chronic Fatigue Syndrome: The Hidden Epidemic (with Jesse A. Stoff, 1988)
 Her Name, Titanic: Untold Story of the Sinking and Finding of the Unsinkable Ship (1988)
 Unearthing Atlantis: An Archaeological Odyssey (1991)
 Return to Sodom and Gomorrah: Bible Stories from Archaeologists (1994)
 Ghosts of the Titanic (2000)
 Ghosts of Vesuvius: A New Look at the Last Days of Pompeii, How Towers Fall, and Other Strange Connections (2004)
 The Jesus Family Tomb: The Discovery, the Investigation, and the Evidence That Could Change History (with Simcha Jacobovici, 2007)
 The Last Train from Hiroshima: The Survivors Look Back (Henry Holt, 2010)
 "Farewell, Titanic: Her Final Legacy," (Foreword by Tom Dettweiler), John Wiley & Sons, N.J. (2012).
 "The Californian Incident," Shoebox/Kindle, Canada (2013).
 "StarTram: The New Race for Space." (with James Powell, George Maise) Shoebox/Kindle, Canada (2013).

Fiction
 The Fallen Sky (1982)
 Flying to Valhalla (1993)
 The Killing Star (with George Zebrowski, 1995)
 Dust (1998)
 Dyson Sphere (with George Zebrowski, 1999)

Filmography
 Lost Civilizations: Aegean - Legacy of Atlantis - Time-Life / NBC (1995).
Re-released on October 1, 2002 as part of a 4-DVD set entitled Time Life's Lost Civilizations.
 Ghosts of the Abyss. With James Cameron (2003).
 Naked Science: Atlantis - National Geographic Channel (2004).
 Aliens of the Deep. With James Cameron (2005).
 The Naked Archaeologist: Joshua - History Channel. Hosted by Simcha Jacobovici (2006).
 American Vesuvius - History Channel (2006).
 Secrets of the Bible - National Geographic Channel (2006).
 The Exodus Decoded - History Channel. With Simcha Jacobovici and James Cameron (2006).
 The Lost Tomb of Jesus - Discovery Channel. With Simcha Jacobovici (2007).
 Three Ground Zeros, A Thousand Paper Cranes (2008)
 A Jewish Home in Pompeii (History Channel, 2009)
 The Last Train From Hiroshima (Japan TV, 2009)
  Pellegrino and the Hiroshima Controversy in America (Japan TV, Hidetaka/Nakamura, 2010)
  The Legacy of Tsutomu Yamaguchi (Japan TV, Hidetaka/Nakamura, 2011)
  Twice Bombed, Twice Survived, Part 2 (Japan TV, Hidetaka/Nakamura, 2012)

References

External links
 Official Website for Charles Pellegrino
 To Hell and Back: The Last Train From Hiroshima
 

1953 births
Living people
Writers from New York City
Victoria University of Wellington alumni
Pseudohistorians
Atlantis proponents
20th-century American novelists
21st-century American non-fiction writers
American male novelists
Charles Darwin biographers
20th-century American male writers
Novelists from New York (state)
American male non-fiction writers
21st-century American male writers